Aunanna Kaadanna is a 2005 Indian Telugu-language romantic drama film directed by Teja. The film stars Uday Kiran and Sadha.

Cast 

Uday Kiran as Ravi
Sadha as Aravinda (credited as Sadaf)
Pilla Prasad as Mangaraju
Dharmavarapu Subramanyam
Suman Shetty
Rallapalli
Sudha
Duvvasi Mohan
Sangeeta
Rama Prabha
Shravya
Nirmala Reddy
Rajendra
Rajababu

Soundtrack 
The music was composed by R. P. Patnaik.
"Avunanna" – R. P. Patnaik
"Gudigantala" – S. P. B. Charan, Usha
"Anaganaga" – KK, Usha
"Nelathalli" – Shankar Mahadevan
"Malinam" – Usha
"Suvvi Suvvi" – K. S. Chithra, Mallikarjun

Production 
Sadha was chosen to make her second collaboration alongside Teja after Jayam. This film marks the third collaboration of Uday Kiran and Teja after Chitram and Nuvvu Nenu. Teja's frequent collaborator, R. P. Patnaik, was roped in to compose the music. The producer spent a good sum of money although he did not make money after Venky and Mr & Mrs Sailaja Krishnamurthy.

Release 
The film released to positive reviews. A critic from Sify praised the performances of the lead actors and Dharmavarapu and stated how "On the whole, Teja tries his best with a sugar-coated love story that is fun to watch". A critic from Idlebrain.com gave the film three and of five stars and praised the performances of much of the cast and the first half of the film.

References

External links 

2000s Telugu-language films
Indian romantic drama films
2005 romantic drama films
2005 films
Films directed by Teja (film director)